Krasnaya Armiya may refer to:

The Red Army
HC CSKA Moscow, a hockey team once affiliated with the Red Army
Krasnaya Armiya (JHL), a junior hockey team affiliated with CSKA Moscow